The 2014 Kentucky Bank Tennis Championships was a professional tennis tournament played on outdoor hard courts. It was the nineteenth edition for the men and the seventeenth edition for the women, and part of the 2014 ATP Challenger Tour and the 2014 ITF Women's Circuit respectively, each offering a total of $50,000 in prize money. The event took place in Lexington, Kentucky, United States, on July 21–27, 2014.

Men's singles main draw entrants

Seeds

 1 Rankings as of July 14, 2014

Other entrants
The following players received wildcards into the singles main draw:
  Jesse Witten
  Jared Donaldson
  Thanasi Kokkinakis
  Eric Quigley

The following players received entry from the qualifying draw:
  Erik Crepaldi
  Marcos Giron
  Yoshihito Nishioka
  Raymond Sarmiento

The following player received a special exemption into the singles main draw:
  Benjamin Mitchell

The following player received entry by a lucky loser spot:
  Evan King
  Jordan Thompson

Women's singles main draw entrants

Seeds

 1 Rankings as of July 14, 2014

Other entrants
The following players received wildcards into the singles main draw:
  Louisa Chirico
  Julie Ditty
  Julia Elbaba
  Jamie Loeb

The following players received entry from the qualifying draw:
  Kristie Ahn
  Jennifer Brady
  Alexandra Mueller
  Maria Sanchez

The following player received entry into the singles main draw as a lucky loser:
  Emily Webley-Smith

The following players entered using a protected ranking:
  Daria Gavrilova

Champions

Men's singles

  James Duckworth def.  James Ward 6–3, 6–4

Women's singles

  Madison Brengle def.  Nicole Gibbs 6–3, 6–4

Men's doubles

  Peter Polansky /  Adil Shamasdin vs.  James McGee /  Chase Buchanan 6–4, 6–2

Women's doubles

  Jocelyn Rae /  Anna Smith def.  Shuko Aoyama /  Keri Wong 6–4, 6–4

External links
 2014 Kentucky Bank Tennis Championships at ITFtennis.com

2014
Lexington
Lexington
Kentucky Bank Tennis Championships
Kentucky Bank Tennis Championships
Kentucky Bank Tennis Championships